The 1987 NCAA Division I women's basketball tournament began on March 11, ended on March 29, and featured 40 teams. The Final Four were Texas, Tennessee, Louisiana Tech, and Long Beach State, with Tennessee winning its first title with a 67-44 victory over Louisiana Tech.  Tennessee's Tonya Edwards was named the Most Outstanding Player of the tournament.

Notable events
Upsets were not unknown in the NCAA tournaments. For example, in the prior year, two 4 seeds made it to the Final Four. However, in the first five NCAA tournaments, once a team reached the Final Four, no team had beaten a higher seeded team. That changed in 1987.

One semifinal game matched defending National Champion Texas against Louisiana Tech. Although both teams were 1 seeds, the Texas team came into the tournament with only a single regular season loss, earning them the number one ranking in the country. In addition, the Final Four was played on the home court of the Longhorns. Despite that, and a crowd of over 15 thousand, the largest crowd in the history of the sport, the Louisiana Tech team managed to beat the Texas team 79–75. The Lady Techsters hit 58.3% of their field goals, the fourth best performance in NCAA Final Four history, and a blistering 73.9% in the second half, missing only six of the 23 shots taken in the second half. Texas tried to wear down Teresa Weatherspoon, but set an NCAA Final Four record with eleven assists, while putting in 19 points of her own.

The other semifinal game matched 2 seed Tennessee against 1 seed Long Beach State. Although Long Beach was averaging over 96 points per game, and had scored 102 in the West Regional final against Ohio State, the Lady Vols held the team to 64 points, and upset the 1 seed by a score of 74–64.

The lone loss by Texas in the regular season had been to Tennessee, ending the Longhorns 40 game win streak, but the two teams played again two weeks later, and this time Texas emerged victorious, with a  14-point victory. Tennessee earned the number one ranking in the AP vote after the win over Texas, but they began to stumble after the loss to Texas, with losses to Auburn, Mississippi and Vanderbilt. They played Louisiana Tech in February, and the lady Techsters won by nine points, dropping the Lady Vols to ninth in the poll. The Tennessee team earned a 2 seed in the NCAA Tournament, but after their upset win against Long Beach, they faced the Louisiana Tech team again, a team that had beaten the Volunteers in 11 of the last 12 meetings. One of those meetings had been the 1982 National Championship game, when the Lady Techsters beat the Volunteers by 23 points. The 1987 Championship would turn that result on its head, as Tennessee won by 23 points, upsetting Louisiana Tech 67–44, for their first National Championship.

Records
Teresa Weatherspoon recorded 11 assists in the National Semifinal game, the most scored in a Final Four game since they started keeping records of this statistic in 1985.

Qualifying teams – automatic
Forty teams were selected to participate in the 1987 NCAA Tournament. Eighteen conferences were eligible for an automatic bid to the 1987 NCAA tournament.

Qualifying teams – at-large
Twenty-two additional teams were selected to complete the forty invitations.

Bids by conference
Nineteen conferences earned an automatic bid. In eleven cases, the automatic bid was the only representative from the conference. Nineteen at-large teams were selected from eight of the conferences. In addition, two independent (not associated with an athletic conference) teams earned at-large bids.

First and second rounds
In 1987, the field remained at 40 teams. The teams were seeded, and assigned to four geographic regions, with seeds 1-10 in each region. In Round 1, seeds 8 and 9 faced each other for the opportunity to face the 1 seed in the second round, while seeds 7 and 10 faced each other for the opportunity to face the 2 seed.
In  the first two rounds, the higher seed was given the opportunity to host the first round game. In most cases, the higher seed accepted the opportunity. The exceptions:
 Eighth seeded South Alabama played nine seed Saint Joseph's (PA) at Saint Joseph's (PA)
 Seventh seeded Eastern Washington played tenth seeded University of Oregon at University of Oregon
 Second seeded Ohio State played tenth seeded University of Oregon at University of Oregon
 Third seeded North Carolina State played sixth seeded Villanova at Villanova

Because Oregon hosted both a first and second round game, there were only 23 first and second round locations, rather than 24.

The following table lists the region, host school, venue and the twenty-four first round locations:

Regionals and Final Four

The regionals, named  for the general location, were held from March 20 to March 23 at these sites:
 Mideast Regional  Stokely Athletics Center, Knoxville, Tennessee (Host: University of Tennessee)
 Midwest Regional  Ewing Coliseum, Monroe, Louisiana (Host: University of Louisiana at Monroe)
 West Regional  Pauley Pavilion, Los Angeles (Host: University of Southern California)
 East Regional  Cumberland  County Memorial Arena, Fayetteville, North Carolina

Bids by state

The forty teams came from twenty states.
Louisiana and Tennessee had the most teams with four each.  Thirty states did not have any teams receiving bids.

Brackets
First and second round games played at higher seed except where noted.

East regional – Fayetteville, North Carolina (Cumberland County Memorial Arena)

Midwest regional – Northeast Louisiana University – Monroe, Louisiana (Fant–Ewing Coliseum)

Mideast regional – University of Tennessee – Knoxville, Tennessee (Stokely Athletic Center)

West regional – University of Southern California – Los Angeles (Pauley Pavilion)

Final Four – University of Texas – Austin, Texas (Frank Erwin Center)

Record by  conference
Fifteen conferences had more than one  bid, or at least one win in NCAA Tournament play:

Six conferences went  0-1: Big East, Gulf Star Conference, High Country, MAAC, MAC, and Mountain West

All-Tournament team

 Tonya Edwards, Tennessee,
 Bridgette Gordon, Tennessee
 Cindy Brown, Long Beach St.
 Clarissa Davis, Texas
 Teresa Weatherspoon, Louisiana Tech

Game officials

 Bill Stokes (semifinal)
 Larry Sheppard (semifinal)
 June Courteau (Semi-Final, Final)
 Patty Broderick (Semi-Final, Final)

See also
 1987 NCAA Division I men's basketball tournament
 1987 NCAA Division II women's basketball tournament
 1987 NCAA Division III women's basketball tournament
 1987 NAIA women's basketball tournament

References

 
NCAA Division I women's basketball tournament
NCAA Division I women's basketball tournament
Basketball in Austin, Texas
NCAA Division I women's basketball tournament